Sticky TV was a New Zealand children's programme created by Pickled Possum Productions that was on New Zealand screens between 2002 and 2017. It aired on TV3 from 2002–11, before moving to FOUR, until July 2016 when it moved back to Three. Hosted by multiple personalities over the years, the presenters as of the end of the show (22 December 2017) were Walter Neilands and Leanna Cooper. Past presenters have made names for themselves on a national level with Drew Neemia, Kanoa Lloyd, Sam Wallace and Julia Wright being some of the most notable.

The show has gone through many transformations over the years but was originally filmed in a studio. The show was then filmed in a park, a separate studio, a rented house and then on a fictional farm, named the "Sticky Farm", before moving into a warehouse.
Sticky TV was cancelled on 22 December 2017. The final episode aired at 7 am on Christmas Day 2017, and was a special containing a special farewell tribute to the show.

Series overview

Presenters

Segments
Sticky TV had numerous segments including teenage issues, cooking, fashion, and obstacle courses segments. In the show's final years, a Relaxation Station with a pond and chairs was added, where segments like WWYD? were held.

Testers
Testers was a segment about testing different things at once. It started around 2015 and tests were done with Harlan and Star, who mostly discussed food and lifestyle. It lasted until the final episode on December 25, 2017.

What Would You Do?
What Would You Do was a segment of Sticky TV about teenage issues, including relationships, bullying, school, other life issues. Viewers can send in a question to be discussed on the show by a group of teenagers who have been selected to host the segment. Like Testers, it too lasted until the final episode.

Quiz Caravan
Quiz Caravan started in 2011 where players will answer 10 questions and win a prize. In 2014, it changed to having 7 questions and win 2 prizes. Once again, it ended with the final episode in 2017.

Fashion Camp 
Fashion Camp first aired its one and only season in 2008, where two teams of three competed to win a prize by designing the best outfit. Themes chosen for the clothing throughout the series included Futuristic and Rockstar.

Survival Camp
Survival Camp first aired early in 2008 with two teams, one team of boys and one team of girls. In Survival Camp the teams take on challenges such as a High Ropes course, Raft and Bivouac building. It changed in 2009 (its second and final year) to having twenty teams of two.

Swaz or Swap
Swaz or Swap was a segment with 10 primary or intermediate students in a competition to get the chance to either get a prize (swaz), or take the money (swap).

Swaz or Swap works by getting a contestant to answer a question, if they answer incorrectly, they are out. If they choose correctly, they get to spin the 'Wheel of Swaz or Swap' which has a variety of cash prizes to win, as well as other prizes underneath the cash prize. The contestant can pick to either take the cash or the hidden prize underneath the cash prize. It is unknown when exactly this segment ended.

Cooking Camp
Cooking Camp was a segment on Sticky TV between 2009 and 2010. Cooking Camp is set up with two teams of three in a cook-off for presentation, taste and menu organisation by an AUT chef. In 2010, it changed to having the teams making meals for judges of 4 who are on blind dates.

Kick It
Kick It was a segment on Sticky TV in 2008. In Kick It, 4 people in teams of 2 are given clues as to where to go around Auckland, and find places and clues until the final leg where the winning team will be determined.

Sticky Stars Karaoke
Sticky Stars Karaoke was a segment from 2010 where people all over New Zealand would sing some karaoke, people would then vote for their favorites to go to the next round. The winner was Daniel Park( Taebz - an emerging artist hailing out of Auckland, New Zealand.)

Sticky Stars Duets
Sticky Stars Duets was the 2011 successor to Sticky Stars Karaoke. The setup was much as the same as the previous segment, with two performers per act instead of one.

The Mud Pit
The Mud Pit was a segment on Sticky TV in 2011. 20 contestants battle it out to become the last one standing. Their reward? Getting into the Mudpit with the chance of winning fantastic prizes.

Sticky Investigation
Sticky I was on air for one year (2008) where there was a small mystery in which two teams consisting of 2–3 people had to solve. They were able to look at a still scene of the crime in which the teams had to look for clues. The team that solved the crime first correctly was the winner.

Sticky Diner
Sticky Diner is a segment of Sticky TV that started airing after Cooking Camp was removed. It started off as 4–5 teams but was later changed to simply two teams. Sticky Diner started off similar to My Kitchen Rules as each team rated their meals to get an overall team score and then the presenter would also give them a score for the final score. With the change to only two teams, the judging process was altered so that the presenters and guest judges decide who wins. Like Swaz or Swap, it is unknown when the segment was removed.

References

External links
 

2002 New Zealand television series debuts
2017 New Zealand television series endings
2000s New Zealand television series
2010s New Zealand television series
English-language television shows
Four (New Zealand TV channel) original programming
New Zealand children's television series
Television shows funded by NZ on Air
Three (TV channel) original programming